Ji Sang-wook (born 16 May 1965) is a South Korean academic and politician in the conservative Bareun Party. He is currently a member of the National Assembly for Jung-gu and Seongdong-gu, Seoul, and was previously head of the party's district organization in Jung-gu.

Before joining the Saenuri Party, Ji was formerly a spokesman for the Liberty Forward Party, and ran as that party's candidate for Mayor of Seoul in 2010. He was nominated again for the post in 2011 but withdrew before the election took place.

Prior to his entry into politics, Ji was a professor at Yonsei University's Graduate School of International Studies. He studied civil engineering as an undergraduate at Yonsei before earning a masters at Stanford University and a doctorate from the University of Tokyo. He met LFP chairman Lee Hoi-chang in the United States after Lee's defeat in the 2002 presidential election, and subsequently served as a close aide to him.

Ji is married to the actress Shim Eun-ha, who has supported him in elections.

Works
 2011:

References

1965 births
Living people
Members of the National Assembly (South Korea)
Bareun Party politicians
Stanford University School of Engineering alumni
University of Tokyo alumni
Yonsei University alumni
Academic staff of Yonsei University
Chungju Ji clan